The Prilep-Bitola dialect (Prilepsko-bitolski dijalekt) is a member of the central subgroup of the western group of dialects of Macedonian. This dialect is spoken in much of the Pelagonia region (more specifically, the Bitola, Prilep, Kruševo and Demir Hisar municipalities), as well as by the Slavic-speaking minority population in and around Florina (Lerin) in neighbouring Greek Macedonia. The Prilep-Bitola dialect, along with other peripheral west-central dialects, provides much of the basis for modern Standard Macedonian. Prestige dialects have developed in the cities of Bitola and Prilep.

Phonological characteristics

The phonological characteristics of the Bitola-Prilep dialect which can also be found in the other peripheral dialects are:
mostly antepenultimate word stress (see Macedonian phonology);
Proto-Slavic *ǫ has reflexed into :
rǫka > рака  ('hand')
ex. Proto-Slavic *kĺučь >  in Bitola sub-dialects,  in Prilep sub-dialects
while most Macedonian dialects have a phonemic  (in loanwords), many sub-dialects of the Prilep-Bitola dialect—with the exception of urban prestige dialects—instead have :
Megleno-Romanian fustan  > вустан  ('ladies' dress')
Ottoman Turkish فوطة  > вута  ('apron')
Ottoman Turkish فرنا   > вурна  ('bakehouse, masonry oven')
the etymological  in initial position has been lost in a number of instances:
in the sequences *vs- and *vz-, as is the case in the standard; e.g. сè  ('all') from the earlier *все, зема  ('to take') from the earlier *взема; 
in a handful of words where the pronunciation was "evened up" with that of their antonyms: натре  from the earlier внатре  ('inside') as per надвор  ('outside'), ногу  from the earlier многу  ('much, a lot') as per малку  ('a little');
intervocalic consonant elision is typical of this dialect, and elided forms are in free variation with non-elided forms:
elision of the intervocalic :
in the plural forms of monosyllabic nouns, e.g. лебо(в)и:
 →  (realized as  ~ )
 and in most other positions, e.g. то(в)ар:
 →  (realized as )
 certain short words (conjunctions, pronouns, determiners, etc.) have undergone further elision, ex.:
  (→ ) →  ('now')
 * (→ ) →  (indic. pron. 'that')
  (→ ) →  (interr. pron. 'when')
use of /v/ instead of the archaic /x/: страх (strah) > страв (fear);
In the sub-dialect of Bukovo-Orehovo, especially among the oldest generations:
чаша  ('cup') is realized as 
жаба  ('frog') is realized as 
the Proto-Slavic syllabic *l̥ has reflexed into , e.g. *sъlnьce >  ('sun'), *vьlkъ >  ('wolf').

Morphological characteristics

tripartite definite article pertaining to the position of the object (see Macedonian grammar);
use of the preposition во (vo) or в (v);
use of the grammatical construction have + past participle: имам работено (imam raboteno; I have worked);
merger of thematic е-group verbs to и-group verbs; e.g. јаде  → јади  (3P sg.  of 'to eat');
the third-person personal pronouns: тој, та/таа/таја, то(а), тие/тија (he, she, it, they);
some of the outermost dialects of the Lerin subdialect have он, она, то, они;
imperfective verbs are typically derived from perfective verbs by means of the suffix –ва (e.g. зборва and боледва) in Bitola dialects, but standard -ува in Prilep dialects;
'expansion' where other dialects have palatalization: падина ("to fall", sing. present third-person) versus the standard паѓа;
use of the oblique form for proper names;
no distinction between masculine and feminine short possessive pronouns, i.e. consistent use of му and го for both genders, in Bitola dialects, but  they are used in the plural third person in Prilep;
use of -јќум and -јким instead of the standard -јќи for the gerund, in older speakers, e.g. одејќум (while walking).

Typical words
чупе 'girl'
преѓе, преѓеска 'recently, lately'
модистра 'seamstress'
бендиса 'to have a liking for something or someone', 'to fancy'
сурат 'face'
плусне 'to fire (a rifle)'
капнат 'exhausted'
греда 'plank', 'beam (of wood)'

Notes

External links
Dialectal dictionary of the Macedonian language dialect spoken in Oshchima (Trigonon), Greece

Dialects of the Macedonian language
Bitola Municipality
Prilep Municipality
Kruševo Municipality
Demir Hisar Municipality